Ladislav Mňačko (28 January 1919 in Valašské Klobouky – 24 February 1994 in Bratislava) was a Slovak writer and journalist. He took part in the partisan movement in Slovakia during World War II. After the war, he was at first a staunch supporter of the Czechoslovak Communist regime and one of its most prominent journalists. However, being disillusioned, he became the regime's vocal critic, for which he was persecuted and censored. In the autumn of 1967 he went to Israel as a protest against the Czechoslovak stance during the Six-Day War, but returned to Czechoslovakia soon afterwards.

After the invasion to Czechoslovakia by the Soviet-led Warsaw Pact in August 1968 he emigrated again, this time to Austria, where he lived for the next 21 years. In 1968 and 1969, he helped selflessly a number of Czechoslovak emigrants who came to Vienna. Shortly after the fall of the communist regime in November 1989 he returned home to Czechoslovakia (January 1990). But subsequent political developments and the growth of nationalism in Slovak part of federation disappointed him. After the dissolution of Czechoslovakia (1992), with which he strongly disagreed he moved to Prague. Died suddenly due to cardiac weakness during a short visit of Slovakia and was buried in Lukovištia.

Mňačko is one of the few Slovak writers of the 1950s and 1960s whose works were translated into English.

There is a permanent exhibition of the study and library of Ladislav Mňačko in Malá vila PNP, Pelléova 20/71, 160 00 Praha 6 – Bubeneč, almost identical to Mňačko's study in his Prague apartment.

Works 
 Smrť sa volá Engelchen (Death Is Called Engelchen), 1959. Translated into English by George Theiner in 1963. Filmed by Ján Kadár in 1963 .
 Oneskorené reportáže (Delayed Reportages), 1963.
 Ako chutí moc (The Taste of Power), 1967. Translated into English by Paul Stevenson in 1967.
 Siedma noc (The Seventh Night), 1968. Translated into English in 1969.

References

External links
 Literárne informačné centrum (LIC): Ladislav Mňačko Biography on litcentrum.sk (Slovak)
 Study and library of Ladislav Mňačko in Prague 

1919 births
1994 deaths
Slovak writers
Slovak novelists
Slovak dramatists and playwrights
Slovak communists
Czechoslovak communists
Czechoslovak emigrants to Austria
People from Valašské Klobouky
Czechoslovak writers
Recipients of the Order of Tomáš Garrigue Masaryk, 1st class